The New Democratic Initiative of Kosovo (IRDK) is a political party in Kosovo registered on 19 July 2001. It represents the Egyptian ethnic minority. IRDK headquarters is located in Peja.

Electoral performance

External links
Official website

2001 establishments in Kosovo
Ashkali
Centrist parties in Kosovo
Political parties established in 2001
Political parties of minorities in Kosovo
Social democratic parties in Kosovo